Elections to Comhairle nan Eilean Siar (Western Isles Council) were held on 3 May 2012, the same day as the other Scottish local government elections. The election was the second one using the 9 wards created as a result of the Local Governance (Scotland) Act 2004. Each ward elected three or four Councillors using the single transferable vote system: a form of proportional representation. A total of 31 Councillors were elected.

Independent councillors retained the large majority of seats on the council and retained control of the administration. The Scottish National Party increased their representation, gaining 4 seats on the Isle of Lewis while losing 1 seat on Barra. The Scottish Labour Party also gained an additional seat.

Election result

Note: "Votes" are the first preference votes. The net gain/loss and percentage changes relate to the result of the previous Scottish local elections on 3 May 2007. This may differ from other published sources showing gain/loss relative to seats held at dissolution of Scotland's councils.

Ward results

Barraigh, Bhatarsaigh, Eirisgeigh agus Uibhist a Deas
2007: 2xSNP; 2xIndependent
2012: 2xIndependent; 1xSNP; 1xLab
2007-2012 Change: Lab gain one seat from SNP

Beinn Na Foghla agus Uibhist a Tuath
2007: 2xIndependent; 1xLab
2012: 2xIndependent; 1xLab
2007: No change

Na Hearadh agus Ceann a Deas Nan Loch
2007: 2xIndependent; 1xSNP
2012: 1xIndependent; 1xSNP; 1xLab
2007-2012 Change: Lab gain one seat from Independent

Sgir' Uige agus Ceann a Tuath Nan Loch
2007: 1xSNP; 1xIndependent; 1xLab
2012: 2xIndependent; 1xSNP
2007-2012 Change: Independent gain one seat from Lab

Sgire an Rubha
2007: 3xIndependent
2012: 3xIndependent
2007-2012 Change: No change

Steòrnabhagh a Deas
2007: 4xIndependent
2012: 3xIndependent; 1xSNP
2007-2012 Change: SNP gain one seat from Independent

Steòrnabhagh a Tuath
2007: 4xIndependent
2012: 3xIndependent; 1xSNP
2007-2012 Change: SNP gain one seat from Independent

Loch a Tuath
2007: 3xIndependent
2012: 2xIndependent; 1xSNP
2007-2012 Change: SNP gain one seat from Independent

An Taobh Siar agus Nis
2007: 4xIndependent
2012: 3xIndependent; 1xSNP
2007-2012 Change: SNP gain one seat from Independent

Changes since election
† Sgir' Uige Agus Ceann A Tuath Nan Loch SNP Cllr Bill Houston died on 15 September 2012. A by-election was held on 29 November 2012 and was won by the Independent Angus MacDonald Morrison.
†† Sgir' An Taobh Siar agus Nis Independent Cllr Kenneth MacLeod Murray died on 23 December 2014. A by-election was to be held to fill the vacancy on 12 March 2015. Only Independent Alistair MacLennan was nominated and was deemed elected.
††† Beinn Na Foghla Agus Uibhist A Tuath Labour Cllr Archie K. McDonald resigned due to health reasons on 25 January 2015. A by-election was held to fill the vacancy on 26 March 2015 and the seat was won by the Independent Andrew Walker.
†††† Sgir' An Taobh Siar agus Nis Independent Cllr Iain Morrison died on 31 July 2015 after a battle with cancer. A by-election was held to fill the vacancy on 7 October 2015 and was won by the Independent John MacLeod.

By-elections since 2012

Ward areas in English

Barraigh, Bhatarsaigh, Eirisgeigh agus Uibhist a Deas: Barra, Vatersay, Eriskay and South Uist
Beinn Na Foghla agus Uibhist a Tuath: Benbecula and North Uist
Na Hearadh agus Ceann a Deas Nan Loch: Harris and South Lewis
Sgir' Uige agus Ceann a Tuath Nan Loch: Mid Lewis
Sgire an Rubha: Eye Peninsula
Steòrnabhagh a Deas: Stornoway South
Steòrnabhagh a Tuath: Stornoway North
Loch a Tuath: Broad Bay
An Taobh Siar agus Nis: North West Lewis

References

External links
 Council website
 Candidates list

2012
2012 Scottish local elections